Sergei Vladimirovich Skakun (born 26 March 1970) is a Belarusian former professional tennis player.

Skakun made his only ATP Tour singles main draw appearance at the 1991 Kremlin Cup, where he lost in the first round to Rüdiger Haas. In 1994 he appeared in four Davis Cup ties for Belarus and was unbeaten, registering three singles and three doubles wins. This was the first year Belarus had competed in the tournament and Skakun had previously competed on tour under the Soviet flag.

See also
List of Belarus Davis Cup team representatives

References

External links
 
 
 

1970 births
Living people
Belarusian male tennis players
Soviet male tennis players